This article provides details of international football games played by the Japan national football team from 2020 to present.

Results

2020

2021

2022

2023

Head to head records
 after the match against .

Notes

References

Japan national football team results
2020s in Japanese sport